This is an episode list for the American reality television series Around the World For Free. The first season aired on WGN America. The show is currently airing on DSTV channel 113 via Sony Entertainment Television (South Africa), Nigeria, Kenya, Uganda, Ghana, Tanzania, Namibia, Botswana, Zambia, Mozambique, Lesotho and Zimbabwe

1. An All-American Launch

2. Caribbean: Bliss & Extreme

3. South American Reality Check

4. Peruvian Sunshine

5. Desert and Cape

6. South African Kaleidoscope

7. Into the Safari Spirit

8. African Hardships

9. Good Vibes in Thailand and Cambodia

10. Living History in Cambodia and Vietnam

11. Back in Good ol’ USA

External links
Ep1: WGN America
Ep2: Caribbean: Bliss & Extreme
Ep3: South American Reality Check
Ep4: Peruvian Sunshine
Ep5: Desert and Cape
Ep6: South African Kaleidoscope
Ep7: Into the Safari Spirit
Ep8: African Hardships
Ep9: Good Vibes in Thailand and Cambodia
Ep10: Living History in Cambodia and Vietnam
Ep11: Back in Good ol’ USA

Around the World for Free